Philip Armstrong (born 23 January 1962) is an English first-class cricketer. He played in one match for Oxford University Cricket Club in 1982.

See also
 List of Oxford University Cricket Club players

References

External links
 

1962 births
Living people
English cricketers
Oxford University cricketers
People from Lambeth
Cricketers from Greater London
Alumni of Harris Manchester College, Oxford